"Come and See Her" is a song written by Stevie Wright and George Young. It was released as the sixth single for their Australian rock group the Easybeats in April 1966, which reached No. 3 on the Australian charts. It was the group's debut single in the United Kingdom, issued on the United Artists Records in July.

Background 

The Easybeats had formed in 1964 in Sydney by Dick Diamonde on bass guitar, Gordon "Snowy" Fleet on drums, Harry Vanda on lead guitar, Stevie Wright on lead vocals and George Young on lead guitar. Their second studio album, It's 2 Easy (March 1966), was produced by  Ted Albert for Parlophone Records/Albert Productions. "Come and See Her" was released as the album's fourth single in April, which charted at No. 1 in Sydney and No. 10 in Melbourne – this was back-calculated in 2005 to be the equivalent of No. 3 on the national singles chart. The track was co-written by group members Wright and Young. Garry Raffaele of The Canberra Times" referred to this song when reviewing their extended play, Easyfever'' (August), "They have turned away from the vocal gimmicks of numbers like
'Come and See Her' and concentrated on normal harmonies and relatively good arrangements." It was the group's debut single in the United Kingdom, appearing on United Artists Records in July.

Single track listing

Australian release

 "Come and See Her"
 "I Can See"

UK release

 "Come and See Her"
 "Make You Feel Alright (Women)"

Charts

References

1966 singles
1966 songs
Albert Productions singles
The Easybeats songs
Songs written by Stevie Wright (Australian singer)
Songs written by George Young (rock musician)
Parlophone singles